Vernon Martin Ingram,  (May 19, 1924 – August 17, 2006) was a German–American professor of biology at the Massachusetts Institute of Technology.

Biography
Ingram was born in Breslau as Werner Adolf Martin Immerwahr, Lower Silesia.  When he was 14, he and his family left Nazi Germany because of their opposition to Nazism (being Jewish) and settled in England. He then Anglicised his name to Vernon Ingram.

During the Second World War, Ingram worked at a chemical factory producing drugs for the war effort and at night studied at Birkbeck College at the University of London. He received a bachelor's degree in chemistry in 1945 and a PhD in organic chemistry in 1949.

After receiving his doctorate, Ingram worked at postdoctoral appointments at the Rockefeller Institute and Yale University.  At Rockefeller, he worked with Moses Kunitz on crystallising proteins.  While at Yale, he studied peptide chemistry with Joseph Fruton.  In 1952, Ingram returned to England and started working at the Cavendish Laboratory at the University of Cambridge, studying protein chemistry.

In 1956, Ingram, John A. Hunt, and Antony O. W. Stretton determined that the change in the haemoglobin molecule in sickle cell disease and trait was the substitution of the glutamic acid in position 6 of the β-chain of the normal protein by valine.  Ingram used electrophoresis and chromatography to show that the amino acid sequence of normal human and sickle cell anaemia haemoglobins differed due to a single substituted amino acid residue. Much of this work was done with the support of Max Perutz and Francis Crick.  Ingram won the William Allan Award from the American Society of Human Genetics in 1967.

This was the first time a researcher demonstrated that a single amino acid exchange in a protein can cause a disease or disorder. As a result, Vernon Ingram is sometimes referred to as "The father of Molecular Medicine."

Ingram joined the MIT faculty in 1958, intending to stay for only one year.  He found that he enjoyed it there so much that he stayed on.  While at MIT, Ingram collaborated with Paul Marks of Columbia University on haemoglobin research.  He was also interested in embryonic haemoglobin and how it differed from that of adults.

By the 1980s, Ingram became interested in neuroscience and especially Alzheimer's disease.  His interest was sparked by the work his second wife, Elizabeth (Beth), was doing with intellectually disabled people in the Boston area.  She had heard that Down syndrome was a disease of the neurofilaments; this turned out not to be the cause, but it was noted that people with Down syndrome did develop Alzheimer's Disease by the time they were 40.

After retirement, Ingram continued his research, maintaining a small laboratory at MIT. He and his wife, Beth, were housemasters of Ashdown House at MIT for 16 years.  Asteroid 6285 Ingram is named in their honour.  Ingram was Director of the Experimental Study Group, an alternative undergraduate education community at MIT, from 1989 to 1999. 

He was elected to the National Academy of Sciences in 2002. 

Ingram died in Boston, Massachusetts, on 17 August 2006 of injuries stemming from a fall.

See also 
Intrabody (intracellular antibody)
Huntingtin and Huntington's disease
Sickle cell anaemia and Hemoglobin

Selected publications
 

 

 

 

 

 

 

 

 

 

 

 

 

Inaugural Article: Efficient reversal of Alzheimer's disease fibril formation and elimination of neurotoxicity by a small molecule 
Barbara J. Blanchard, Albert Chen, Leslie M. Rozeboom, Kate A. Stafford, Peter Weigele, and Vernon M. Ingram
PNAS 2004 101: 14326-14332

See also
 MIT Biology Department

References

External links
 Vernon Ingram Playlist Appearance on WMBR's Dinnertime Sampler radio show 12 March 2003
Key Participants: Vernon M. Ingram – It's in the Blood!  A Documentary History of Linus Pauling, Hemoglobin, and Sickle Cell Anemia
 

 Obituary of Vernon Ingram from the MIT News Office

1924 births
Members of the United States National Academy of Sciences
2006 deaths
Jewish emigrants from Nazi Germany to the United Kingdom
People from the Province of Lower Silesia
Alumni of Birkbeck, University of London
American biologists
Fellows of the Royal Society
20th-century biologists
British emigrants to the United States